Veronika Foltová (born 21 September 1980) is a Paralympian athlete from the Czech Republic competing mainly in category F35/36 throwing events.

Veronika successfully competed in the 2004 Summer Paralympics in Athens where she won gold medals in both the discus and shot put and a silver medal in the javelin.

External links
 profile on paralympic.org
 Profile at the South Bohemian University

Paralympic athletes of the Czech Republic
Athletes (track and field) at the 2004 Summer Paralympics
Paralympic gold medalists for the Czech Republic
Paralympic silver medalists for the Czech Republic
Living people
1980 births
Medalists at the 2004 Summer Paralympics
Paralympic medalists in athletics (track and field)
Czech female discus throwers
Czech female javelin throwers
Czech female shot putters
20th-century Czech women
21st-century Czech women